= Starfire (role-playing game) =

1989 role-playing game

Starfire is a role-playing game published in 1989 by Starfire.

== Contents ==
Starfire is a game in which the player characters are members of the Starfire freedom fighting organization dedicated to freeing mankind from the insectoid Nytharkans.

== Reception ==
Steve G Jones reviewed Starfire for Games International magazine, and gave it a rating of 4 out of 10, and stated that "Overall, Starfire fails to make any great strides in science fiction rolegame design, but it is much cheaper than the competition."
